Adam Scicluna is a Multi Award Winning Australian entertainer

Career
As a professional entertainer for 20 years Adam has received 8 Australia Entertainment MO Awards and 5 Australian Club Entertainment Awards for Male Performer of the Year, including two prestigious Gold “MO” Awards for Peter Allen Performer of the Year. 	

His career began in the world of Opera with performances at the Sydney Opera House in the presence of Prime Ministers and Heads of State. 	

Adam has played over 30 lead roles ranging from classics like Tevye in Fiddler on the Roof to modern masterpieces such as God in Children of Eden, for both the above performances he received rave revues. 	

He is one of few performers to have played both Javert and Jean Valjean in Les Miserable. 	

Adam also appeared as The Lion and Cogsworth in Packemin Productions of The Wizard of Oz and Beauty and the Beast at Riverside Theatre.	

Most recently he starred as Edward Bloom in the musical adaptation of the smash hit Big Fish.	

His musical theatre work also includes cast and workshop recordings under the direction of well-known musical theatre identities Tony Sheldon and Nancye Hayes. 	

In 1998 he was a backing vocalist for “The Phantom Michael Crawford.	

Adam’s Cabaret “A Lyrical Life” was a sell-out success at Riverside Theatre.	

Adam has worked in short film, corporate film, TV and Radio and as a guest performer on International Television. 	

In 2008 Adam was invited to perform for Crowned Prince Fredrick and Princess Mary of Denmark. 	

During the last 15 years Adam has toured nationally and internationally on the corporate, cabaret and cruise ship circuits.

Awards

Mo Awards
The Australian Entertainment Mo Awards (commonly known informally as the Mo Awards), were annual Australian entertainment industry awards. They recognise achievements in live entertainment in Australia from 1975 to 2016. Adam Scicluna has won 7 awards.
 (wins only)
|-
| 2002
| Adam Scicluna
| Johnny O'Keefe Encouragement Award
| 
|-
| 2004
| Adam Scicluna
| Male Vocal Variety Performer of the Year
| 
|-
| 2007
| Adam Scicluna
| Male Performer of the Year
| 
|-
| 2010
| Adam Scicluna
| Male Performer of the Year
| 
|-
|rowspan="2"| 2011
| Adam Scicluna
| Male Performer of the Year
| 
|-
| Adam Scicluna
| Performer of the Year
| 
|-
| 2012
| Adam Scicluna
| Performer of the Year
|

References 

Living people
Australian comedians
Year of birth missing (living people)